Whitesides is an English surname. Notable people with the surname include:

Dan Whitesides (born 1977), American drummer
George M. Whitesides (born 1939), American chemist and academic
George T. Whitesides, American businessman
Jacob Whitesides (born 1997), American singer-songwriter 
Kevin Whitesides (born 1964), American racing driver
Loretta Hidalgo Whitesides, American author and public speaker
Sue Whitesides, Canadian mathematician and computer scientist
Thomas Whitesides (1836–1919), Australian cricketer
Tyler Whitesides (born 1987, American writer

See also
Whiteside Theatre, historic theater building in Corvallis, Oregon, United States
Winny v. Whitesides
Whiteside (disambiguation)

English-language surnames